The Puniu River is a river of the Waikato region of New Zealand's North Island.

Geology 
About half the river's course from its sources on the edge of the Rangitoto Range is through deep valleys and gorges formed of Late Jurassic to Early Cretaceous Manaia Hill Group greywacke (a form of sandstone, with little or no bedding, fine to medium grained, interbedded with siltstone and conglomerate, and with many quartz veins), which is buried in many places by Quaternary ignimbrites. The main ignimbrite is the Ongatiti Formation, up to 150 m thick of compound, weakly to strongly welded, vitrophyric (phenocrysts embedded in a glassy rock), including pumice-, andesite and rhyolite lavas. In several places the river runs past slopes covered in blocks of ignimbrite, where the underlying greywacke has eroded.

For the remainder of its course, the river meanders over alluvium and colluvium to the Waipa. Initially these are mainly the Late Quaternary Piako Subgroup, which includes Late Pleistocene alluvium, and minor fan deposits of unconsolidated to very soft, thinly to thickly bedded, yellow-grey to orange-brown, pumiceous mud, silt, sandy mud and gravel, with local muddy peat. Finally, the river flows mostly over the Holocene floodplain, where the alluvium and colluvium consist of variously coloured, unconsolidated sand, silt, mud, clay, local gravel and thin intercalated (a form of interbedding, where distinct deposits in close proximity migrate back and forth) peat beds.

Vegetation 
The river rises in the Pureora Forest Park, before flowing past some unprotected remnants of rimu-tawa forest. In its lower reaches the river mostly flows through farmland, where the Puniu River Care Project is working on restoration of the river.

Speed of flow 
In its final  from Tokanui flows usually take 9 to 17 hours, depending on river levels.

Pollution 
The Puniu is 6th dirtiest out of 13 sampling points in the Waipa catchment, with unsatisfactory nitrogen, phosphorus and turbidity levels. Puniu is the only river in Waikato with worsening ammonia levels.

Bridges 
The river originally had a seasonal ford near Kihikihi. It was largely built in 1936, completed in 1937 and still serves SH3.

See also
List of rivers of New Zealand

References

External links 
 Current river level.
 Water quality monitoring at Bartons Corner Rd
 Rainfall at Pokuru Road Bridge, Te Awamutu and Ngaroma
 Water level at Pokuru Road Bridge, Te Awamutu
 photo of old bridge about 1921
 1936 photos of bridge and road deviation under construction

1:50,000 map - source, mouth

Google Maps 'Street Views' from the six bridges over the river - Pokuru Rd, SH3 Otorohanga Rd, Bayley Rd, Wharepapa S Rd, Bayley Rd, Ngaroma Rd.

Rivers of Waikato
Rivers of New Zealand